The Breda Ba.65 was an Italian all-metal single-engine, low-wing monoplane used by Aviazione Legionaria during the Spanish Civil War and Regia Aeronautica in the first half of World War II. It was the only Italian ground-attack aircraft that saw active service in this role. It saw service almost exclusively in the North African and Middle-Eastern theatre.  In addition to more than 150 aircraft operated by the Italian forces, a total of 55 were exported and used by the air forces of Iraq, Chile and Portugal.

Design and development
An evolution of Ba.64, the Ba.65 was designed by Antonio Parano and Giuseppe Panzeri. It was a single-seat, all-metal, low-wing cantilever monoplane with aft-retracting main undercarriage. Like its predecessor, it was intended to undertake aeroplano di combattimento multiple roles as a fighter, attack and reconnaissance aircraft. The Ba.65 carried wing-mounted armament of two 12.7 mm (0.5 in) and two 7.7 mm (0.303 in) Breda-SAFAT machine guns, with internal stowage for a 200 kg (440 lb) bombload in addition to external ordnance that could total 1,000 kg (2,200 lb). The prototype, which was first flown in September 1935, like the initial production aircraft, used the 522 kW (700 hp) Gnôme-Rhône K-14 radial engine produced under license by Isotta Fraschini. Starting from the 82nd aircraft, the more powerful Fiat A.80 RC.41 18-cylinder, twin-row radial engine with a takeoff rating of 746 kW (1,000 hp) was adopted. Production ceased in July 1939 after 218 aircraft were built by Breda and Caproni.

Operational history

The Ba.65 debuted during the Spanish Civil War. Thirteen Series I aircraft, powered by the Gnôme-Rhône engine, equipped the 65a Squadriglia of the Aviazione Legionaria (Legionary Air Force). The unit took part in operations at Santander in August 1937, then at the battles of Teruel and the Ebro. The aircraft proved effective and was compared positively with the German Junkers Ju 87 Stuka. In a unique engagement, one of the Legionary Air Force pilots scored an air-to-air victory when he encountered a lone twin-engine Tupolev SB bomber over Soria and shot it down. Of the 23 Ba.65s sent to Spain, 12 were lost in the course of the civil war. They flew 1,921 sorties, including 368 ground-strafing and 59 dive bombing attacks. When the Aviazione Legionaria returned to Italy in May 1939, they transferred their 11 surviving Ba.65s to the Spanish Air Force.

A total of 25 Fiat-powered Ba.65s two-seaters were sold to the Kingdom of Iraq in 1938. These consisted of 22 equipped with Breda L turrets and two dual control trainers. From 2–31 May 1941, the Royal Iraqi Air Force flew the Ba.65 during the Anglo-Iraqi War. War broke out after an Iraqi coup d'état installed a new government while maintaining the existing monarchy.  The Ba.65 was used against armed forces of the United Kingdom and the Commonwealth of Nations which the coup leaders were trying to expel from bases established after Iraq's independence under the Anglo-Iraqi Treaty of 1930.

During World War II, the Ba.65 was employed against the British in North Africa. When Italy entered the war in June 1940 about 150 aircraft were reported to be still in service, but suffered heavy losses facing the British fighters. Most were either out of service or shot down by early 1942. The aircraft, which had been forcibly kept in service after the failure of the Ba.88 and the poor performance of the Caproni Ca.310, was replaced in the dive bomber role by modified Savoia-Marchetti S.79s or fighters. Despite having been destined for scrap at the beginning of hostilities and pulled back into action, the Bredas of 50 Stormo fought a bitter and courageous battle from 13 June 1940 to the remainder of the year. The Bredas proved to be deadly and precise in the role of low level ground attack and dive bombing in comparison with other aircraft available. In the hands of pilots like Capt. Antonio dell'Oro, Tenente Adriano Visconti and Spanish civil war veteran pilots who were properly trained to fly the aircraft it proved a bitter pill for British armoured forces caught in the desert. Notable encounters included missions carried out at Sidi Rezegh and Sidi Barrani. The Bredas were even involved in one air battle causing the loss of 3 Gloster Gladiators.

Chile bought 20 Ba.65 (17 single-seaters and three dual control trainers) powered by the Piaggio P.XI C.40 (also a 14K derivative) late in 1938. Portugal purchased 10 Breda equipped with Fiat engines and Breda L Turrets in November 1939.

Variants
Ba.65
Single-seat
Ba-65bis
Two-seat bomber
Ba-65bis
Two-seat trainer

Operators

 Regia Aeronautica
 Aviazione Legionaria

 Royal Iraqi Air Force

 Chilean Air Force

 Paraguayan Air Force

 Portuguese Air Force

 Spanish Air Force

Specifications (single-seat version)

See also

References

Notes

Bibliography
 Angelucci, Enzo and Paolo Matricardi. World Aircraft: World War II, Volume I (Sampson Low Guides). Maidenhead, UK: Sampson Low, 1978. .

 Mondey, David. "Breda Ba.65." The Hamlyn Concise Guide to Axis Aircraft of World War II. New York: Bounty Books, 2006. .

 Sgarlato, Nico. Italian Aircraft of World War II. Warren, Michigan: Squadron/Signal Publications, 1979. .
 Shores, Christopher. Regia Aeronautica, a Pictorial History of the Italian Air Force. Vol. 1: 1940–1943. Warren, Michigan: Squadron/Signal Publications, 1976. No ISBN.
 Taylor, Michael J.H. Jane's Encyclopedia of Aviation Vol. 2 . Danbury, Connecticut: Grolier Educational Corporation, 1980.  .
 Winchester, Jim. "Breda Ba.65." Aircraft of World War II (The Aviation Factfile). Kent, UK: Grange Books plc, 2004. .

Ba.065
1930s Italian attack aircraft
World War II Italian ground attack aircraft
Single-engined tractor aircraft
Low-wing aircraft
Aircraft first flown in 1935